The Critics Choice Association (CCA), formerly the Broadcast Film Critics Association (BFCA) is an association of television, radio and online critics. Their membership includes critics who review film and television. Founded in 1995, it is the largest film critics organization in the United States and Canada.  The organization has presented the Critics' Choice Awards, aim to recognize movies (with the Critics' Choice Movie Awards and the Critics' Choice Super Awards), television programs (with the Critics' Choice Real TV Awards, the Critics' Choice Super Awards and the Critics' Choice Television Awards) and documentaries (with the Critics' Choice Documentary Awards) each year since 1995. The association also selects a Film of the Month and recommends other films throughout the year, based on the cumulative grades each film receives in the monthly balloting.

Membership
BFCA members are professional entertainment journalists and "working critics whose reviews are broadcast on a regular basis to a wide audience, either on television, on radio, or (in special cases) on the internet." More specific requirements must be met by radio- and internet-based critics:
 Radio film critics "must be heard in at least five markets in addition to their primary radio station, unless their primary outlet is in a major city"  such as New York, Los Angeles, Dallas, St. Louis, and Toronto
 Internet-based critics must be "well-known print critics as well, or among the few internet critics whose reviews are read by a large enough audience", are "easily accessible on their site," and "identified as the site's primary critic."

Charity work
A portion of the proceeds from the best tables at the Critics' Choice Movie Awards is donated to charities such as the Starlight Children's Foundation and Heifer International.

Broadcast Television Journalists Association 
The Broadcast Television Journalists Association (BTJA) launched in 2011 as an offshoot of the BFCA. The BTJA presented its first awards at a ceremony luncheon at the Beverly Hills Hotel in Los Angeles in June 2011.  Cat Deeley hosted the event. On November 17, 2017, the BJTA Executive Committee announced the appointment of Ed Martin, a member of the BJTA since 1990, as its new president, succeeding founder Joey Berlin. Martin also serves as the editor and chief television and content critic of MediaVillage.

References

External links
Critics Choice

American film critics associations
Canadian film critics associations
Organizations established in 1995